David Latasa Lasa (born 14 February 1974) is a Spanish retired road racing cyclist. He competed at the 2003 Tour de France.

Results at the Grand Tours

Tour de France
2003: 73°

Giro d'Italia
2001: 35°

Vuelta a España
2002: 84°
2003: 46°
2004: 50°
2005: 71°

References

1974 births
Living people
Sportspeople from Pamplona
Spanish male cyclists
Cyclists from Navarre